This is a list of institutions of the Texas Medical Center.

Patient care institutions
 Baylor St. Luke's Medical Center, affiliated with and partially owned by Baylor College of Medicine.
 Ben Taub General Hospital, part of the Harris Health System, Level 1 trauma hospital affiliated with Baylor College of Medicine (BCM)
 Houston Methodist Hospital, affiliated with Texas A&M Health Science Center College of Medicine and Weill Cornell Medical College  
 John Sealy Hospital, Level 1 trauma center affiliated with UTMB at Galveston   
 Memorial Hermann-Texas Medical Center, Level 1 trauma center affiliated with McGovern Medical School (formerly UTHealth Medical School)
Children's Memorial Hermann Hospital
 Michael E. DeBakey Veterans Affairs Medical Center in Houston, affiliated with BCM
 Rebecca Sealy Hospital, part of the University of Texas Medical Branch at Galveston. 
 Shriner's Hospital for Children — Galveston, burn care unit 
 Shriners Hospitals for Children — Houston
 Texas Children's Hospital, affiliated with BCM
 TIRR Memorial Hermann, affiliated with BCM and McGovern Medical School
 The University of Texas M. D. Anderson Cancer Center, affiliated with BCM, McGovern Medical School, UTMB Galveston, and Texas A&M Health Science Center

Educational institutions

Academic and research institutions
 Baylor College of Medicine
 Houston Academy of Medicine-Texas Medical Center Library
 Houston Community College System — Health Science Programs
 Houston Methodist Hospital
 Houston Methodist Research Institute
 Houston Methodist DeBakey Heart Center
 Methodist Neurological Institute
 Center for Cell and Gene Therapy
 Prairie View A&M College of Nursing
 Rice University-BioScience Research Collaborative
 Texas A&M Health Science Center Institute of Biosciences and Technology (IBT)
 Texas Children's Hospital
 Texas Children's Cancer Center
 Texas Heart Institute
 Texas Woman's University Institute of Health Sciences, Houston
 University of Texas Health Science Center at Houston
 University of Texas M. D. Anderson Cancer Center
 University of Texas Medical Branch at Galveston  
Galveston National Laboratory

Secondary schools
 Michael E. DeBakey High School for Health Professions — named after Michael E. DeBakey

Support facilities

 Gulf Coast Regional Blood Center
 John P. McGovern Museum of Health and Medical Science
 Ronald McDonald House of Houston
 Ronald McDonald House of Galveston
 YMCA Child Care Center in the Texas Medical Center
 The Menninger Clinic
 DePelchin Children's Center
 Sabin Vaccine Institute

References

Lists of buildings and structures in Texas